Sylvester Krnka (in Czech Sylvestr Krnka; 29 December 1825, Velký Bor – 4 January 1903, Michle) was a Czech gunsmith and inventor, best known for his M1867 Russian Krnka.

Life
At the age of thirteen he entered into the apprenticeship with the well-known gunsmith master Novotny in Vienna later known as company Springer. Some years later he became a burgess of Volyně in the South Bohemian Region where he shortly had his own workshop since 1848. In 1871 he moved to Michle, then a village near Prague, where he opened his gunsmith workshop (which later became a factory). He died in 1903 in Michle.  
 
Krnka was the designer of a breechloader rifle, a conversion of the muzzle-loading Model 1857 rifle musket.  Although he had been continuously declined by the Austrian military authorities, he was more successful in Montenegro, in Russia – in the Russo-Turkish War (1877–78) his M1867 Russian Krnka triumphed – in Romania, Bulgaria, Sweden and in Norway.

He had been awarded with many decorations and orders in Russia, Montenegro, Sweden and Norway.

His son  (1858–1926) carried on with his father's work.

Czech inventors
1825 births
1903 deaths
People from Klatovy District
Firearm designers